Trichoderma ovalisporum is a species of fungus. It has ovoidal conidia and a fast rate of growth at 30 °C. It has been considered for its biocontrol potential against Moniliophthora roreri.

References

Trichoderma
Fungi described in 2004